All At Sea is a 1929  silent film comedy starring Karl Dane and George K. Arthur. It was produced and distributed by MGM and directed by Alfred J. Goulding.

The film survives incomplete.

Cast
 Karl Dane - Stupid McDuff
 George K. Arthur - Rollo the Great
 Josephine Dunn - Shirley Page
 Herbert Prior - Mr. Page
 Eddie Baker - The Marine

References

External links
 All At Sea @ IMDb.com
 
 lobby poster
 other poster

1929 films
American silent feature films
Metro-Goldwyn-Mayer films
Films directed by Alfred J. Goulding
1929 comedy films
Silent American comedy films
American black-and-white films
1920s American films
1920s English-language films